Navuduru is a village in Veeravasaram mandal, located in  West Godavari district of the Indian state of Andhra Pradesh.

Demographics 
 Census of India, Navuduru had a population of 3218. The total population constitute, 1607 males and 1611 females with a sex ratio of 1002 females per 1000 males. 304 children are in the age group of 0–6 years, with sex ratio of 1013. The average literacy rate stands at 76.46%.

References 

Villages in West Godavari district